Mandwala is a village in Jalore tehsil of Jalore district of Rajasthan state in India. It lies 19 km to the north-west of Jalore town. The village has a  government higher secondary school (for girls and boys), and a government hospital. Mandwala is the business hub of nearby villages and its people are known for their entrepreneurship spirit who have made their fortunes in cities like Mumbai, Bangalore, Chennai, Delhi and Hyderabad.

Temples
The songiara chauhan of the village have started construction of the kuldevi temple (Maa ashapuri temple) in the village it might require a few years 

It has the Jahaj Mandir (a Jain temple built in the shape of a ship). The main Jain temple named after Lord Sumathinath  is over 60 years old and is located in the village square.

It also has Baba Ramdevji temple, Hanumanji Temple, it have also have a thakurji temple ( Krishnaji temple) nd many more hindu temple

Transport
Nearest airports are at Jodhpur and Udaipur. Nearest railway station is Bishangharh, about 5 km away.

References

External links
 Mandwala Location

Villages in Jalore district